Antonio Annarumma (10 January 1947, Monteforte Irpino, Campania – 19 November 1969, Milan) was an Italian policeman who was killed at age 22 while serving during a demonstration organized by the Italian (Marxist–Leninist) Communist Party and from the Student Movement. He is sometimes considered to be the first victim of the Years of Lead, a period of social and political upheaval in Italy.

The demonstration passed in front of the Teatro Lirico,  Milan, where a union rally was held by CISL with speaker Bruno Storti.

During attacks on the police, Annarumma was hit by an iron tube, according to the court inquiry. After he was struck the vehicle he was driving  hit another police officer.
Students believe it is the accident which killed him, but this claim was repudiated by the medical examination.

Notes 

1947 births
1969 deaths
Italian police officers
People from Milan
Deaths related to the Years of Lead (Italy)
Male murder victims
1969 murders in Italy